The Women's CIMB Kuala Lumpur Nicol David Open Squash Championships 2012 is the women's edition of the 2012 Kuala Lumpur Open Squash Championships, which is a tournament of the WSA World Series event Gold (prize money: $70,000). The event took place in Kuala Lumpur in Malaysia from 26 March to 31 March. Nicol David won her seventh CIMB Kuala Lumpur Open trophy, beating Annie Au in the final.

Prize money and ranking points
For 2012, the prize purse was $70,000. The prize money and points breakdown is as follows:

Seeds

Draw and results

See also
Men's Kuala Lumpur Open Squash Championships 2012
WSA World Series 2012
Kuala Lumpur Open Squash Championships

References

External links
WSA CIMB Kuala Lumpur Nicol David Open 2012 website
CIMB Kuala Lumpur Nicol David Open 2012 Squashsite website

Squash tournaments in Malaysia
Kuala Lumpur Open Squash Championships
2012 in Malaysian women's sport
2012 in women's squash